The House of Leszczyński (plural: Leszczyńscy, feminine form: Leszczyńska) was a prominent Polish noble family. They were magnates in the Polish–Lithuanian Commonwealth and later became royal family of Poland.

History
The Leszczyński family was a magnate family. In 1473, Rafał Leszczyński obtained from Emperor Frederick III the title of count. This title was conferred on "the entire family". The last representative of the main family, Stanisław Leszczyński, King of Poland, Grand Duke of Lithuania and later Duke of Lorraine, died in 1766.

The family name derives from Leszczyna, now a suburb of Leszno, Greater Poland. The Leszczyński family obtained the title of count of Leszno in the Holy Roman Empire. The family had its greatest importance in the late 16th and early 17th centuries, when they were ardent supporters of Calvinism and turned their estates of Leszno and Baranów Sandomierski into major centres of the Polish Reformed Church.

There is another unrelated Leszczyński family with the Abdank coat of arms.

Coat of arms and motto
The Leszczyński family used the Clan Wieniawa arms, and their motto was Qui Lescynsciorum genus ignorat, Poloniae ignorat.

Notable family members 
Rafał Leszczyński (died 1441), Podkomorzy of Kalisz, general starost of Wielkopolska, progenitor of the Leszczyński family
Rafał Leszczyński (c. 1526-1592), Voivode of Brześć Kujawski Voivodeship and castellan of Śrem
Wacław Leszczyński (1576–1628), Voivode of Kalisz Voivodship, Great Chancellor of the Crown
Rafał Leszczyński (1579–1636), Voivode of Belz Voivodship, leader of Polish Calvinists
Jan Leszczyński (1603-1678), Great Chancellor of the Crown
Wacław Leszczyński (1605–1666), Bishop of Warmia, Primate of Poland
Przecław Leszczyński (1605-1670), Voivode of Dorpat Voivodship
Andrzej Leszczyński (1606–1651), Palatine of Dorpat Voivodship
Andrzej Leszczyński (1608–1658), Primate of Poland, Great Chancellor of the Crown
Bogusław Leszczyński (1614–1659), Grand Treasurer and Deputy Chancellor of the Crown
Jan Leszczyński (died 1657), Bishop of Kijów (Kyiv, also Kiev)
Samuel Leszczyński (1637-1676), poet, Voivode of Dorpat Voivodship
Rafał Leszczyński (1650–1703), Grand Treasurer of the Crown 
Stanisław Leszczyński (1677–1766), King of Poland and later Duke of Lorraine, married Catherine Opalińska
Maria Leszczyńska (1703–1768), Queen of France, married to Louis XV of France

Famous descendants

Among the descendants of Stanislaw Leszczyński were four Kings of France and Navarre, two Kings of the Two Sicilies, two Kings of Etruria, two Kings of Italy (simultaneously one Emperor of Ethiopia and one King of the Albanians), six Kings and one Queen of Spain, two Emperors of Brazil (simultaneously one King of Portugal and Algarve), five Kings and one Queen of Portugal and Algarve, one Emperor of Austria (simultaneously one King of Hungary), five Kings of Saxony, four Kings of Belgium, one King of Bavaria, two Tsars of Bulgaria, three Kings of Romania, one King of Yugoslavia, two Princes of Lichtenstein, two Grand Dukes and two Grand Duchess of Luxembourg, several Queen consorts and several titular Kings.

Tree
Stanisław Leszczyński, married Catherine Opalińska
Maria Leszczyńska, married Louis XV of France
Louise Élisabeth of France, married Philip, Duke of Parma
Princess Isabella of Parma, married Joseph II, Holy Roman Emperor
Ferdinand, Duke of Parma, married Archduchess Maria Amalia of Austria
Princess Carolina of Parma, married Prince Maximilian of Saxony (descendant of King John III Sobieski)
Princess Maria Anna of Saxony (1799–1832)
Archduchess Auguste Ferdinande of Austria
Ludwig III of Bavaria 
Frederick Augustus II of Saxony 
John of Saxony 
Princess Elisabeth of Saxony
Margherita of Savoy
Victor Emmanuel III of Italy 
Umberto II of Italy 
Giovanna of Italy
Simeon Saxe-Coburg-Gotha 
Albert of Saxony 
Frederick Augustus I of Saxony 
George, King of Saxony 
Frederick Augustus III of Saxony 
Princess Maria Josepha of Saxony (1867–1944)
Charles I of Austria 
Otto von Habsburg
Maria Josepha Amalia, Queen of Spain 
Louis, King of Etruria 
Charles II, Duke of Parma 
Maria Luisa, Queen of Spain
Carlota Joaquina of Spain
Miguel I of Portugal 
Infanta Maria Josepha of Portugal
Marie-Adélaïde, Grand Duchess of Luxembourg 
Charlotte, Grand Duchess of Luxembourg 
Jean, Grand Duke of Luxembourg 
Elisabeth of Bavaria, Queen of Belgium
Leopold III of Belgium 
Baudouin of Belgium 
Albert II of Belgium 
Philippe of Belgium , married to Queen Mathilde of Belgium, the daughter of Countess Anna Maria Komorowska (the current reigning King of Belgium)
Princess Joséphine Charlotte of Belgium
Henri, Grand Duke of Luxembourg  (the current reigning Grand Duke of Luxembourg)
Infanta Maria Theresa of Portugal
Archduchess Elisabeth Amalie of Austria
Franz Joseph II, Prince of Liechtenstein 
Hans-Adam II, Prince of Liechtenstein  (the current reigning Prince of Liechtenstein)
Pedro I of Brazil 
Pedro II of Brazil 
Maria II of Portugal 
Pedro V of Portugal 
Luís I of Portugal 
Carlos I of Portugal 
Manuel II of Portugal 
Infanta Antónia of Portugal
Ferdinand I of Romania 
Carol II of Romania 
Michael I of Romania 
Margareta of Romania 
Maria of Yugoslavia
Peter II of Yugoslavia 
Maria Luisa of Spain, Duchess of Lucca
Ferdinand VII of Spain 
Isabella II of Spain 
María Isabella of Spain
Ferdinand II of the Two Sicilies 
Francis II of the Two Sicilies 
Prince Alfonso, Count of Caserta
Prince Carlos of Bourbon-Two Sicilies
Princess María de las Mercedes of Bourbon-Two Sicilies
Juan Carlos I of Spain 
Felipe VI of Spain  (the current reigning King of Spain)
Ferdinand VII of Spain
Isabella II of Spain 
Alfonso XII of Spain 
Alfonso XIII of Spain 
Louis Ferdinand
Louis XVI of France 
Louis XVII of France 
Louis XVIII of France 
Charles X of France 
Louis Antoine, Duke of Angoulême 
Princess Louise Marie Thérèse of Artois
Robert I, Duke of Parma 
Marie Louise of Bourbon-Parma
Boris III of Bulgaria

Palaces

Further reading
 Stanisław Karwowski, Leszczyńscy herbu Wieniawa, Lwów 1916
 Hanna Malewska, Panowie Leszczyńscy, 1961
 Zieliński, Ryszard (1978). Polka na francuskim tronie. Czytelnik.

References